Dieffenbachia seguine, also known as dumbcane, or tuftroot, is a species of Dieffenbachia native to the tropical Americas—from southern Mexico, through Central America, to northern South America and Brazil. It is also native to several Caribbean islands, including Puerto Rico.

Description
The plant's leaves are large and green, and often with variegated white patterns. Like other Dieffenbachias, the sap is toxic. It has showy white flowers.

Cultivation
Dieffenbachia seguine is cultivated as an ornamental plant in temperate shade gardens and as a potted house plant. Cultivars emphasize different patterns of variegation.

References

External links

Kemper Center for Home Gardening

seguine
Flora of Central America
Flora of the Caribbean
Flora of the Andes
Flora of Puerto Rico
Flora of the United States Virgin Islands
Flora of Mexico
Flora of Brazil
Flora of Venezuela
House plants
Garden plants of Central America
Garden plants of South America
Poisonous plants
Flora without expected TNC conservation status